Nesi, Nesis or NESI may refer to:

Science and technology
 NESI (Net-centric Enterprised Solutions for Interoperability), a joint effort between the US Navy and USAF
 Northeast Snowfall Impact Scale (NESIS), created to measure snowstorms in the US Northeast
 New Zealand eScience Infrastructure (NeSI), a specialised platform of shared high performance computing

People
 , a mummy in Biblioteca Museu Víctor Balaguer
 Nerio Nesi (born 1925), Italian politician, businessman and banker
 Giovanni Nesi (born 1986), Italian pianist and professor of academic music
 Alexander Nesis (born 1962), founder, president and CEO of the ICT Group, a private equity firm headquartered in Moscow
 Luiz Ferreira Nesi, Brazilian footballer

Other uses
 Nesi, a film by G. Ramesh

See also
 Nessie, the Loch Ness Monster, in Scottish folklore
 Nasi (Hebrew title)
 Nes (disambiguation)